John Langshaw Austin (26 March 1911 – 8 February 1960) was a British philosopher of language and leading proponent of ordinary language philosophy, best known for developing the theory of speech acts.

Austin pointed out that we use language to do things as well as to assert things, and that the utterance of a statement like "I promise to do so-and-so" is best understood as doing something—making a promise—rather than making an assertion about anything. Hence the name of one of his best-known works How to Do Things with Words. Austin, in providing his theory of speech acts, makes a significant challenge to the philosophy of language, far beyond merely elucidating a class of morphological sentence forms that function to do what they name. Austin's work ultimately suggests that all speech and all utterance is the doing of something with words and signs, challenging a metaphysics of language that would posit denotative, propositional assertion as the essence of language and meaning.

Life
Austin was born in Lancaster, England, the second son of Geoffrey Langshaw Austin (1884–1971), an architect, and Mary Hutton Bowes-Wilson (1883–1948; née Wilson). In 1921 the family moved to Scotland, where Austin's father became the secretary of St Leonards School, St Andrews. Austin was educated at Shrewsbury School in 1924, earning a scholarship in Classics, and went on to study Classics at Balliol College, Oxford, in 1929.

In 1930 he received a First in Classical Moderations (Greek and Latin) and in the following year won the Gaisford Prize for Greek prose. In finals in 1933 he received a first in Literae Humaniores (Philosophy and Ancient History). Literae Humaniores introduced him to serious philosophy and gave him a lifelong interest in Aristotle. He undertook his first teaching position in 1935, as fellow and tutor at Magdalen College, Oxford.

Austin's early interests included Aristotle, Kant, Leibniz, and Plato (especially the Theaetetus). His more contemporary influences included especially G. E. Moore, John Cook Wilson and H. A. Prichard. The contemporary influences shaped their views about general philosophical questions on the basis of careful attention to the more specific judgements we make. They took our specific judgements to be more secure than more general judgements. According to Guy Longworth writing in The Stanford Encyclopedia of Philosophy: "It's plausible that some aspects of Austin's distinctive approach to philosophical questions derived from his engagement with the last three [i.e., Moore, Wilson, and Prichard]."

During World War II Austin served in the British Intelligence Corps. It has been said of him that, "he more than anybody was responsible for the life-saving accuracy of the D-Day intelligence" (reported in Warnock 1963: 9). Austin left the army with the rank of lieutenant colonel and was honored for his intelligence work with an OBE (Officer of the Order of the British Empire), the French Croix de Guerre, and the U.S. Officer of the Legion of Merit.

After the war Austin became White's Professor of Moral Philosophy at Oxford, as a Professorial Fellow of Corpus Christi College. Publishing little, his influence would largely make itself felt through his teaching in lectures and tutorials and, especially, his famous 'Saturday morning meetings'.

Austin visited Harvard and Berkeley in the mid-fifties, in 1955 delivering the William James Lectures at Harvard that would become How to Do Things With Words, and offering a seminar on excuses whose material would find its way into "A Plea for Excuses". It was at this time that he met and befriended Noam Chomsky. He was president of the Aristotelian Society from 1956 to 1957.

Austin died, shortly after being diagnosed with lung cancer, at the age of 48. At the time of his death, he was developing a semantic theory based on sound symbolism, using the English gl-words as data.

Work

How to Do Things with Words
How to Do Things with Words (1955/1962) is perhaps Austin's most influential work. In contrast to the positivist view, he argues, sentences with truth-values form only a small part of the range of utterances.

After introducing several kinds of sentences which he asserts are neither true nor false, he turns in particular to one of these kinds of sentences, which he calls performative utterances or just "performatives". These he characterises by two features:

 Again, though they may take the form of a typical indicative sentence, performative sentences are not used to describe (or "constate") and are thus not true or false; they have no truth-value.
 Second, to utter one of these sentences in appropriate circumstances is not just to "say" something, but rather to perform a certain kind of action.

He goes on to say that when something goes wrong in connection with a performative utterance it is, as he puts it, "infelicitous", or "unhappy" rather than false.

The action which is performed when a 'performative utterance' is issued belongs to what Austin later calls a speech-act (more particularly, the kind of action Austin has in mind is what he subsequently terms the illocutionary act). For example, if you say "I name this ship the Queen Elizabeth," and the circumstances are appropriate in certain ways, then you will have done something special, namely, you will have performed the act of naming the ship. Other examples include: "I take this man as my lawfully wedded husband," used in the course of a marriage ceremony, or "I bequeath this watch to my brother," as occurring in a will. In all three cases the sentence is not being used to describe or state what one is 'doing', but being used to actually 'do' it.

After numerous attempts to find more characteristics of performatives, and after having met with many difficulties, Austin makes what he calls a "fresh start", in which he considers "more generally the senses in which to say something may be to do something, or in saying something we do something".

For example: John Smith turns to Sue Snub and says 'Is Jeff's shirt red?’, to which Sue replies 'Yes'. John has produced a series of bodily movements which result in the production of a certain sound. Austin called such a performance a phonetic act, and called the act a phone. John's utterance also conforms to the lexical and grammatical conventions of English—that is, John has produced an English sentence. Austin called this a phatic act, and labels such utterances phemes. John also referred to Jeff's shirt, and to the colour red. To use a pheme with a more or less definite sense and reference is to utter a rheme, and to perform a rhetic act. Note that rhemes are a sub-class of phemes, which in turn are a sub-class of phones. One cannot perform a rheme without also performing a pheme and a phone. The performance of these three acts is the performance of a locution—it is the act of saying something.

John has therefore performed a locutionary act. He has also done at least two other things. He has asked a question, and he has elicited an answer from Sue.

Asking a question is an example of what Austin called an illocutionary act. Other examples would be making an assertion, giving an order, and promising to do something. To perform an illocutionary act is to use a locution with a certain force. It is an act performed in saying something, in contrast with a locution, the act of saying something.

Eliciting an answer is an example of what Austin calls a perlocutionary act, an act performed by saying something. Notice that if one successfully performs a perlocution, one also succeeds in performing both an illocution and a locution.

In the theory of speech acts, attention has especially focused on the illocutionary act, much less on the locutionary and perlocutionary act, and only rarely on the subdivision of the locution into phone, pheme and rheme.

How to Do Things With Words is based on lectures given at Oxford between 1951 and 1954, and then at Harvard in 1955.

Performative utterance

According to J. L. Austin, "performative utterance" refers to a not truth-valuable action of "performing", or "doing" a certain action. For example, when people say "I promise to do so and so", they are generating the action of making a promise. In this case, without any flaw (the promise is flawlessly fulfilled), the "performative utterance" is "happy", or to use J. L. Austin's word, "felicitous"; if on the other hand, one fails to do what he or she promised, it can be "unhappy", or "infelicitous". Notice that performative utterance is not truth-valuable, which means nothing said can be judged based on truth or falsity. 
 
There are four types of performatives according to Austin: explicit, implicit, primitive, and inexplicit. "How to Do Things With Words", edited by J. O. Urmson and Marina Bissau, records Austin's lectures on this topic. In this book, Austin offers examples for each type of performative mentioned above. For explicit performative, he mentioned "I apologize", "I criticize" (Page 83), which are so explicit to receivers that it would not make sense for someone to ask "Does he really mean that?". Inexplicit performatives are the opposite, where the receiver will have understandable doubts. For a primary performative, the example Austin gave is "I shall be there". Compared with explicit performatives, there is uncertainty in implicit performatives. People might ask if he or she is promising to be there with primary performatives, however, this uncertainty is not strong enough as in explicit performatives. Most examples given are explicit because they are easy to identify and observe, and identifying other performatives requires comparison and contrast with explicit performatives.

Sense and Sensibilia

In the posthumously published Sense and Sensibilia (the title is Austin's own, and wittily echoes the title of Sense and Sensibility, Jane Austen's first book, just as his name echoes hers), Austin criticizes the claims put forward by A. J. Ayer's The Foundations of Empirical Knowledge (1940), and to a lesser extent, H. H. Price's Perception (1932) and G. J. Warnock's Berkeley (1953), concerning the sense-data theory. He states that perceptual variation, which can be attributed to physical causes, does not involve a figurative disconnection between sense and reference, due to an unreasonable separation of parts from the perceived object. Central to his argument, he shows that "there is no one kind of thing that we 'perceive' but many different kinds, the number being reducible if at all by scientific investigation and not by philosophy" (Austin 1962a, 4).
 
Austin argues that Ayer fails to understand the proper function of such words as "illusion", "delusion", "hallucination", "looks", "appears" and "seems", and uses them instead in a "special way...invented by philosophers." According to Austin, normally these words allow us to express reservations about our commitment to the truth of what we are saying, and that the introduction of sense-data adds nothing to our understanding of or ability to talk about what we see.
 
As an example, Austin examines the word 'real' and contrasts the ordinary meanings of that word based on everyday language and the ways it is used by sense-data theorists. In order to determine the meaning of 'real' we have to consider, case by case, the ways and contexts in which it is used. By observing that it is (i) a substantive-hungry word that is sometimes (ii) an adjuster-word, as well as (iii) a dimension-word and (iv) a word whose negative use "wears the trousers," Austin highlights its complexities.  Only by doing so, according to Austin, can we avoid introducing false dichotomies.

Philosophical Papers
Austin's papers were collected and published posthumously as Philosophical Papers by J. O. Urmson and Geoffrey Warnock. The book originally contained ten papers, two more being added in the second edition and one in the third. His paper Excuses has had a massive impact on criminal law theory.

Chapters 1 and 3 study how a word may have different, but related, senses. Chapters 2 and 4 discuss the nature of knowledge, focusing on performative utterance. Chapters 5 and 6 study the correspondence theory, where a statement is true when it corresponds to a fact. Chapters 6 and 10 concern the doctrine of speech acts. Chapters 8, 9, and 12 reflect on the problems that language encounters in discussing actions and considering the cases of excuses, accusations, and freedom.

"Are there A Priori Concepts?"
This early paper contains a broad criticism of Idealism. The question set dealing with the existence of a priori concepts is treated only indirectly, by dismissing the concept of concept that underpins it.

The first part of this paper takes the form of a reply to an argument for the existence of Universals: from observing that we do use words such as "grey" or "circular" and that we use a single term in each case, it follows that there must be a something that is named by such terms—a universal. Furthermore, since each case of "grey" or "circular" is different, it follows that universals themselves cannot be sensed.

Austin carefully dismantles this argument, and in the process other transcendental arguments. He points out first that universals are not "something we stumble across", and that they are defined by their relation to particulars. He continues by pointing out that, from the observation that we use "grey" and "circular" as if they were the names of things, it simply does not follow that there is something that is named. In the process he dismisses the notion that "words are essentially proper names", asking "...why, if 'one identical' word is used, must there be 'one identical object' present which it denotes".

In the second part of the article, he generalizes this argument against universals to address concepts as a whole. He points out that it is "facile" to treat concepts as if they were "an article of property". Such questions as "Do we possess such-and-such a concept" and "how do we come to possess such-and-such a concept" are meaningless, because concepts are not the sort of thing that one possesses.

In the final part of the paper, Austin further extends the discussion to relations, presenting a series of arguments to reject the idea that there is some thing that is a relation. His argument likely follows from the conjecture of his colleague, S. V. Tezlaf, who questioned what makes "this" "that".

"The Meaning of a Word"
The Meaning of a Word is a polemic against doing philosophy by attempting to pin down the meaning of the words used, arguing that 'there is no simple and handy appendage of a word called "the meaning of the word (x)"'.

Austin warns us to take care when removing words from their ordinary usage, giving numerous examples of how this can lead to error.

"Other Minds"

In Other Minds, one of his most highly acclaimed pieces, Austin criticizes the method that philosophers have used since Descartes to analyze and verify statements of the form "That person S feels X." This method works from the following three assumptions:

(1) We can know only if we intuit and directly feel what he feels.
(2) It is impossible to do so.
(3) It may be possible to find strong evidence for belief in our impressions.

Although Austin agrees with (2), quipping that "we should be in a pretty predicament if I did", he found (1) to be false and (3) to be therefore unnecessary. The background assumption to (1), Austin claims, is that if I say that I know X and later find out that X is false, I did not know it. Austin believes that this is not consistent with the way we actually use language. He claims that if I was in a position where I would normally say that I know X, if X should turn out to be false, I would be speechless rather than self-corrective. He gives an argument that this is so by suggesting that believing is to knowing as intending is to promising— knowing and promising are the speech-act versions of believing and intending respectively.

"A Plea for Excuses"
A Plea for Excuses is both a demonstration by example, and a defense of the methods of ordinary language philosophy, which proceeds on the conviction that:
"...our common stock of words embodies all the distinctions men have found worth drawing, and the connections they have found worth marking, in the lifetime of many generations: these surely are likely to be more numerous, more sound, since they have stood up to the long test of survival of the fittest, and more subtle, at least in all ordinary and reasonable practical matters, than any that you or I are likely to think up in our armchair of an afternoon—the most favourite alternative method."

An example of such a distinction Austin describes in a footnote is that between the phrases "by mistake" and "by accident". Although their uses are similar, Austin argues that with the right examples we can see that a distinction exists in when one or the other phrase is appropriate.

Austin proposes some curious philosophical tools. For instance, he uses a sort of word game for developing an understanding of a key concept. This involves taking up a dictionary and finding a selection of terms relating to the key concept, then looking up each of the words in the explanation of their meaning. This process is iterated until the list of words begins to repeat, closing in a "family circle" of words relating to the key concept.

Austin, Wittgenstein and Ryle
Austin occupies a place in philosophy of language alongside the Cantabrigian Wittgenstein and Austin's fellow Oxonian Gilbert Ryle in staunchly advocating the examination of the way words are ordinarily used in order to elucidate meaning and by this means avoid philosophical confusion. Unlike many ordinary language philosophers, however, Austin disavowed any overt indebtedness to Wittgenstein's later philosophy.

Quotes
 "The theory of truth is a series of truisms"  -  Proceedings of the Aristotelian Society, vol. xxiv (1950). Philosophical Papers, p. 121, Oxford University Press, second edition (1970)
 "Sentences are not as such either true or false" - Sense and Sensibilia (1962), p. 111
 “It is, of course, not really correct that a sentence ever is a statement: rather, it is used in making a statement, and the statement itself is a ‘logical construction’ out of the makings of statements.” - How to Do Things with Words (1955) Lecture 1, page 1 footnote 1 The William James Lectures at Harvard University. Oxford at the Clarendon press.
 "Going back into the history of a word, very often into Latin, we come back pretty commonly to pictures or models of how things happen or are done. These models may be fairly sophisticated and recent, as is perhaps the case with 'motive' or 'impulse', but one of the commonest and most primitive types of model is one which is apt to baffle us through its very naturalness and simplicity." - A Plea for Excuses (1956) Published in Proceedings of the Aristotelian Society, 1956-7. Transcribed into hypertext by Andrew Chrucky, 23 August 2004.
"A sentence is made up of words, a statement is made in words.... Statements are made, words or sentences are used." Proceedings of the Aristotelian Society, vol. xxiv (1950) - Philosophical Papers, p. 120, Oxford University Press, second edition (1970)
 "We walk along the cliff, and I feel a sudden impulse to push you over, which I promptly do: I acted on impulse, yet I certainly intended to push you over, and may even have devised a little ruse to achieve it; yet even then I did not act deliberately, for I did not (stop to) ask myself whether to do it or not." - Philosophical Papers, "The Meaning of a Word," p. 195, Oxford University Press, second edition (1970).
 "You are more than entitled not to know what the word 'performative' means. It is a new word and an ugly word, and perhaps it does not mean anything very much. But at any rate there is one thing in its favor, it is not a profound word." - "Performative Utterances." Philosophical Papers, p. 233, Oxford University Press, second edition (1970).
 "Let us distinguish between acting intentionally and acting deliberately or on purpose, as far as this can be done by attending to what language can teach us." - Philosophical Papers, "Three Ways of Spilling Ink," p. 273, Oxford University Press, second edition (1970).
 "Usually it is uses of words, not words in themselves, that are properly called 'vague.'" - Sense and Sensibilia, p. 126, Oxford University Press (1962).
 "But then we have to ask, of course, what this class comprises. We are given, as examples, 'familiar objects'--chairs, tables, pictures, books, flowers, pens, cigarettes; the expression 'material thing' is not here (or anywhere else in Ayer's text) further defined. But does the ordinary man believe that what he perceives is (always) something like furniture, or like these other 'familiar objects'—moderate-sized specimens of dry goods?" - Sense and Sensibilia, p. 8, Oxford University Press (1962).
To which Morgenbesser responded in a dismissive tone, "Yeah, yeah." (Some have quoted it as "Yeah, right.")

Publications

Books

Authored 
 Philosophical Papers, 1961, 1970, 1979, (eds. J. O. Urmson and G. J. Warnock), Oxford: Oxford University Press.  (= Austin 1979)
How to Do Things with Words: The William James Lectures delivered at Harvard University in 1955, 1962 (eds. J. O. Urmson and Marina Sbisà), Oxford: Clarendon Press. 
 Sense and Sensibilia, 1962 (ed. G. J. Warnock), Oxford: Clarendon Press.

Translated 

 The Foundations of Arithmetic. A logico-mathematical enquiry into the concept of number (Oxford: Basil Blackwell, 1950) by Gottlob Frege, Translation J. L. Austin. UIN: BLL01001320611.

Papers and articles
 1930s–1940s, "The Line and the Cave in Plato's Republic," reconstructed from notes by J. O. Urmson, in Austin 1979.
 1938ms, extracts in: Price, A. (2018) "J. L. Austin’s Lecture Notes on the Nicomachean Ethics: Making Sense of Aristotle on Akrasia." In Oxford Studies in Ancient Philosophy, V. 55.
 1939ms/1967, "Agathon and Eudaimonia in the Ethics of Aristotle," in J. M. E. Moravcsik (ed.), Aristotle, New York: Doubleday. Reprinted in Austin 1979.
 1939, "Are There A Priori Concepts?" Proceedings of the Aristotelian Society, Supplementary Volume 18: 83–105. Reprinted in Austin 1979.
 1940ms, "The Meaning of Words," in Austin 1979.
 1946, "Other Minds," Proceedings of the Aristotelian Society, Supplementary Volume 20: 148–187. Reprinted in Austin 1979.
 1950, "Truth," Proceedings of the Aristotelian Society, Supplementary Volume 24: 111–128. Reprinted in Austin 1979.
 1953, "How to Talk—some simple ways" Proceedings of the Aristotelian Society, 53: 227–246. Reprinted in Austin 1979.
 1954ms, "Unfair to Facts," in Austin 1979.
 1956a, "Ifs and Cans," Proceedings of the British Academy. Reprinted in Austin 1979.
 1956b, "Performative Utterances," corrected transcript of an unscripted radio talk delivered in the Third Programme of the BBC. In Austin 1979.
 1957, "A Plea for Excuses: The Presidential Address", Proceedings of the Aristotelian Society, 57: 1–30. Reprinted in Austin 1979.
 1958, "Pretending" Proceedings of the Aristotelian Society, Supplementary Volume 32: 261–278. Reprinted in Austin 1979.
 1962, "Performatif-Constatif," in Cahiers de Royaumont, Philosophie No. IV, La Philosophie Analytique, Les Editions de Minuit. Translated in 1963 as"Performative-Constative" by G. J. Warnock, in C. E. Caton ed., Philosophy and Ordinary Language, University of Illinois Press.
 1966, "Three Ways of Spilling Ink", L. W. Forguson (ed.), The Philosophical Review, 75 (4): 427–440. Reprinted in Austin 1979.

See also

Epistemology
Linguistics
Performative turn
Pragmatics
Semantics
Adolf Reinach
Word

References

Further reading 
 Berlin, I. et al., (ed.) (1973) Essays on J.L. Austin, Oxford: The Clarendon Press. 
 Cavell, S. (1990), The Claim of Reason: Wittgenstein, Skepticism, Morality, and Tragedy, New York: Oxford University Press. (The major work by one of Austin's most prominent heirs. Takes ordinary language approaches to issues of skepticism, but also makes those approaches a subject of scrutiny).
 Fann, K.T., ed. (1969), Symposium on J.L. Austin, New York: Humanities Press.
 Friggieri, Joe (1993), " Linguaggio e azione. Saggio su J. L. Austin", Milano:  Vita e Pensiero
 Friggieri, Joe (1991), "Actions and Speech Actions: In the Philosophy of J. L. Austin", Msida: Mireva Publications
 Garvey, Brian, ed. (2004), J. L. Austin on Language, Palgrave, Houndmills (UK). (Includes Remembering J. L. Austin by Austin's younger sister, Ann Lendrum, and Recollections of J. L. Austin by John Searle).
 Gustafsson, M. and Sørli, R. (2011), The Philosophy of J. L. Austin. Oxford: Oxford University Press. (anthology of philosophical essays on Austin's work).
 Kirkham, R. (1992, reprinted 1995), Theories of Truth: A Critical Introduction. Cambridge, MA: MIT Press. . (Chapter 4 contains a detailed discussion of Austin's theory of truth).
 Passmore, J. (1966), A Hundred Years of Philosophy, rev. ed. New York: Basic Books. (Chapter 18 includes a perceptive exposition of Austin's philosophical project).
 Pitcher, G. (1973), "Austin: a personal memoir" in Essays on J.L. Austin, ed. Berlin, I. et al. Oxford: The Clarendon Press.
 Putnam, H. (1999),  "The Importance of Being Austin: The Need of a 'Second Näivetē'" Lecture Two in The Threefold Cord: Mind, Body, and World New York: Columbia University Press. (In arguing for "naive realism", Putnam invokes Austin's handling of sense-data theories and their reliance on arguments from perceptual illusion in Sense and Sensibilia, which Putnam calls "one of the most unjustly neglected classics of analytics philosophy").
 Searle, J. (1969), Speech Acts: An Essay in the Philosophy of Language, Cambridge: Cambridge University Press. (Searle's has been the most notable of attempts to extend and adjust Austin's conception of speech acts).
 Searle, J. (1979), Expression and Meaning: Studies in the Theory of Speech Acts, Cambridge: Cambridge University Press, 1979.
 Soames, S. (2005), Philosophical Analysis in the Twentieth Century: Volume II: The Age of Meaning. Princeton: Princeton UP. (Contains a large section on ordinary language philosophy, and a chapter on Austin's treatment of skepticism and perception in Sense and Sensibilia).
 Warnock, G. J. (1969) "John Langshaw Austin, a biographical sketch", in Symposium on J. L. Austin, K.T. Fann (ed), New York: Humanities Press.
 Warnock, G. J. (1979), Philosophical Papers, Oxford: OUP (Clarendon Paperbacks),  
 Warnock, G. J. (1973), "Saturday Mornings" in Essays on J.L. Austin I. Berlin et al. (ed) Oxford: The Clarendon Press.
 Warnock, G. J. (1992), J. L. Austin, London: Routledge.

External links 

 J. L. Austin The Stanford Encyclopedia of Philosophy
 
"J. L. Austin: A return to common sense" TLS Online 'Footnotes to Plato''' article by Guy Longworth (on 'Austin's view that philosophers fail to understand everyday speech').
"Guy Longworth on J.L. Austin and Ordinary Language" Philosophy Bites'' (audio) interview.
 Lecture and Q&A session by J. L. Austin in Sweden (October 1959), uploaded by Harvard Philosophy Department to YouTube

1911 births
1960 deaths
20th-century British male writers
20th-century British writers
20th-century British non-fiction writers
20th-century British philosophers
20th-century essayists
Action theorists
Alumni of Balliol College, Oxford
Analytic philosophers
Aristotelian philosophers
British Army personnel of World War II
British essayists
British ethicists
British logicians
British male non-fiction writers
Deaths from lung cancer in England
Epistemologists
History of logic
Intelligence Corps officers
Literacy and society theorists
Metaphysicians
Officers of the Order of the British Empire
Ontologists
Ordinary language philosophy
People educated at Shrewsbury School
People from Lancaster, Lancashire
Philosophers of language
Philosophers of logic
Philosophers of mind
Philosophy writers
Presidents of the Aristotelian Society
White's Professors of Moral Philosophy